Onyekachi Eze Silas (born 10 June 1996) is a Nigerian footballer who plays as a forward for U.D. Vilafranquense in LigaPro.

References

External links
Onyekachi Silas at Football Database

1996 births
Living people
Gondomar S.C. players
Gil Vicente F.C. players
U.D. Vilafranquense players
Campeonato de Portugal (league) players
Liga Portugal 2 players
Nigerian footballers
Nigerian expatriate footballers
Expatriate footballers in Portugal
Nigerian expatriate sportspeople in Portugal
Association football forwards
Sportspeople from Kaduna